The Institute of Management and Technology, Enugu, popularly known as IMT Enugu, is a polytechnic college located in Enugu State, Nigeria.

The state-owned Institute of Management and Technology is a polytechnic school that was founded in 1965.

The National Board for Technical Education (NBTE), Nigeria, has officially certified and/or recognized the Institute of Management and Technology, Enugu, Enugu State.

Notable alumni
 Azuka Okwuosa – former Anambra State Commissioner for Works and Transport
 Phyno – Nigerian Rapper, singer-songwriter and a record producer

Courses 
The institution offers the following courses:

Purchasing & Supply

Graphic Design

Printing Technology

Fashion Design and Clothing Technology

Fine & Applied Art

Ceramic Technology

Science Laboratory Technology

Food Technology

Hospitality Management

Statistics

Computer Science

Estate Management

Architecture

Quantity Surveying

Urban and Regional Planning

Building Technology

Insurance

Banking and Finance

Accountancy

Library and Information science

Mass Communication

Mechatronics Engineering

Mechanical Engineering

Electrical/Electronics Engineering

Civil Engineering

Chemical Engineering

Agric Engineering

Public Administration

Office Technology and Management

Co-operative Economics and Management

Business Admin and Management

References

Universities and colleges in Nigeria
Business schools in Nigeria
Buildings and structures in Enugu State